The Volkov-Yartsev VYa-23 (Волков-Ярцев ВЯ-23) is a  autocannon, used on Soviet aircraft during World War II.

Development
In 1940, A.A. Volkov and S.A. Yartsev created an autocannon, called TKB-201 for the new 23 mm round. It was intended to be the primary weapon of the Ilyushin Il-2 ground attack aircraft. The original intention was to create a gun capable of penetrating German tank armour.

Due to unavailability of Il-2, the first airborne testing was performed using a Messerschmitt Bf 110 heavy fighter sold by Germany in 1940. After testing on Il-2 in 1941, TKB-201 was accepted into service as VYa-23. A total of 64,655 VYa-23 were built.

Description
The VYa-23 is a gas-operated belt-fed autocannon with a rate of fire of 600 rounds per minute - a high rate of fire for the caliber at the time. The gun was 2.140 metres long, and weighed 68 kg. Its main disadvantages are powerful recoil and very abrupt functioning of the firing and reloading mechanisms which decreased service life and often caused jamming that could not be fixed in mid-air.

According to a US intelligence report, the VYa-23 used an upscaled version of the Berezin UB mechanism.

Ammunition

A powerful new 23×152mm cartridge was specifically developed for the VYa. The same caliber was later used also in the post-war towed ZU-23 and self-propelled ZSU-23-4 23mm AA guns. However, the ammunition for this later AA gun has a different powder charge and primer, and is thus not interchangeable. The ammunition is externally easily recognizable: VYa ammunition has brass cases, while post-war AA ammunition has steel cases.

The ammunition for VYa included fragmentation-incendiary, fragmentation-incendiary-tracer, and armor-piercing-incendiary rounds. The total weight and filling of HE rounds were more than twice that of the 20 mm ammunition used by the ShVAK and Berezin B-20 cannons. The armor-piercing round could penetrate 25 mm (1 in) of armor at 400 m (1,300 ft). The main characteristics of VYa ammunition according to Christian Koll's Russian Ammunition site are listed in the table below:

Production 
A total of 64,655 VYa-23 were produced. Soviet archives give the following known production numbers by year:
 1942 — 13,420
 1943 — 16,430
 1944 — 22,820
 1945 — 873
 1946 — 2,002
 1947 — 1,247

Service 
The VYa-23 cannon was mounted on Il-2 and Il-10 ground attack aircraft, on LaGG-3 and Yak-9 fighter aircraft, and on the experimental Mikoyan-Gurevich DIS long range fighter aircraft.

In spite of the large round, the VYa-23 proved to be a disappointment in its intended anti-tank role. Light German tanks could be defeated from the side or rear only, with front armor of all tanks impervious. Medium tanks could be defeated if hit into the top of the turret or the engine compartment from under 400 m (1,300 ft) in a greater than 40-degree dive—a very difficult maneuver in Il-2 even under the most ideal conditions compounded by the difficulty of aiming at a small target.

See also
Related developments:
 Nudelman-Suranov NS-23, the VYa-23's successor which replaced it on the IL-10 and in other applications
Similar weapons:
 2A14 cannons in ZU-23
 ShVAK cannon
 MG FF cannon
 MG 151 cannon
 Hispano HS.404 cannon
 Berezin B-20 cannon

References
Notes

Bibliography
 Широкоград А.Б. (2001) История авиационного вооружения Харвест (Shirokograd A.B. (2001) Istorya aviatsionnogo vooruzhenia Harvest. ) (History of aircraft armament)

 Chinn, George M. The Machine Gun. Vol II, Part VII. US Department of the Navy, 1952
 A LaGG-3 in Japan. 31 May 2004

External links

 archive photo
 a VYa-23 pulled from a swamp in Karelia (video)

Autocannons of the Soviet Union
Aircraft guns of the Soviet Union
23 mm artillery
KBP Instrument Design Bureau products
Weapons and ammunition introduced in 1941